Kulli is a village in Tõrva Parish, Valga County in Estonia.

References 

Villages in Valga County